Książkowice  is a village in the administrative district of Gmina Lubsza, within Brzeg County, Opole Voivodeship, in south-western Poland.

References

Villages in Brzeg County